William Francis Scott (26 April 1880 – 11 September 1969) was an Australian rules footballer who played with South Melbourne in the Victorian Football League (VFL).

Notes

References
 South Melbourne Team, Melbourne Punch, (Thursday, 4 June 1903), p.16.

External links 

1880 births
1969 deaths
Australian rules footballers from Geelong
Sydney Swans players
Brighton Football Club players